The Moldavia Regional Committee of the Communist Party of Ukraine, commonly referred to as the Moldavia CPU obkom, was the position of highest authority in the Moldavian ASSR, in the Ukrainian SSR of the Soviet Union. 

The position was established on 15 October 1924 by former members of the former Soviet puppet state Bessarabian Socialist Soviet Republic. After an unsuccessful attempt to establish the Bessarabian Socialist Soviet Republic soon after World War I. The position was known as a responsible secretary of Orgbureau of the Communist Party of Ukraine for the Moldavian ASSR until 21 December 1924. In 1924–1932 it was known as a responsible secretary of the Moldavia Regional Committee. Upon occupation of the Romanian Bessarabia on 14 August 1940, the position was reorganized as part of the separate Communist Party of the Moldavian SSR.

The First Secretary was a de facto appointed position usually by the Central Committee of the Communist Party of Ukraine or the First Secretary of that party.

List of First Secretaries of Moldavia Regional Committee of the Communist Party of Ukraine

See also
Moldavian ASSR

Notes

Sources
  at www.worldstatesmen.org

1924 establishments in the Soviet Union
1940 disestablishments in the Soviet Union
Regional Committees of the Communist Party of Ukraine (Soviet Union)
Moldavian Autonomous Soviet Socialist Republic